Canistropsis correia-araujoi is a species of flowering plant in the genus Canistropsis.

This bromeliad is endemic to the Atlantic Forest biome (Mata Atlantica Brasileira) within Rio de Janeiro (state) and São Paulo (state), located in southeastern Brazil.

References

correia-araujoi
Endemic flora of Brazil
Flora of Rio de Janeiro (state)
Flora of São Paulo (state)
Flora of the Atlantic Forest